Snaith and Cowick is a civil parish in the East Riding of Yorkshire, England.

The civil parish is formed by the town of Snaith and the villages of East Cowick and West Cowick.
According to the 2011 UK census, Snaith and Cowick had a population of 3,579, an increase on the 2001 UK census figure of 3,028.

The parish was part of the Goole Rural District in the West Riding of Yorkshire from 1894 to 1974, then in Boothferry district of Humberside until 1996.

References

External links

Civil parishes in the East Riding of Yorkshire